Kofi Etsiba Shaw (born August 3, 1983, in Sekondi Takoradi) is a Ghanaian footballer, who played for Malacca FA in the Malaysian Super League for the 2007–2008 season.

References

1983 births
Ghanaian footballers
Living people
Village United F.C. players
Sporting Kansas City players
Expatriate footballers in Jamaica
Association footballers not categorized by position